Japonica lutea  is a small butterfly found in the East Palearctic that belongs to the lycaenids or blues family.

Description from Seitz

Z. lutea Hew. (74 f). The outer margin of the wings strongly rounded. particularly in the female; hind wing with a long tail. Honey-yellow, the forewing with a broad black distal border. Underside with a white submarginal line, which separates the disc from the orange-red distal margin; on the disc white- edged bands, a short similar hand on the cross-veins of the forewing. In Amurland and Japan. — Larva on Quercus mongolica, very frequently infested with the larvae of Diptera. The butterflies occur in August on wide roads in forests of high trees and also in bush-woods; they are rather plentiful in many places. The Continental specimens do not differ from Japanese ones; the black border of the forewing varies rather strongly in width among the individuals from the same locality.

Biology
The larva on  feeds on Quercus mongolica , other Quercus and  Cyclobalanopsis glauca.

Subspecies
 Japonica lutea lutea Japan.
 Japonica lutea adusta (Riley, 1939) Sichuan, East Tibet
 Japonica lutea dubatolovi Fujioka, 1993 Amur Oblast, Ussuri. 
 Japonica lutea gansuensis Murayama, 1991 
 Japonica lutea patungkoanui Murayama, 1956 Taiwan.
 Japonica lutea tatsienluica (Riley, 1939) Szechuan.

See also
List of butterflies of Russia

References

Theclini